The 2023 AIR Awards is the upcoming seventeenth annual Australian Independent Record Labels Association Music Awards ceremony (generally known as the AIR Awards), scheduled to take place on 3 August 2023 in Adelaide. The 2023 AIR Awards will introduce two new categories; the Independent Marketing Team of the Year and the Independent Publicity Team of the Year.

Performances
 TBA

Nominees
 TBA

See also
 Music of Australia

References

2023 in Australian music
2023 music awards
AIR Awards